The Ellimist Chronicles is a children's science-fiction novel, a companion book to the Animorphs series written by K. A. Applegate. It tells the backstory of the Ellimist, a god-like being from the story. The introduction shows that the Ellimist is telling his story to an unnamed, dying Animorph, foreshadowing the events of the final book of the series.

Plot summary
As an unnamed Animorph lies on the brink of death, the Ellimist appears and recounts his origins as Azure Level, Seven Spar, Extension Two, Down-Messenger, Forty-One (Toomin) the Ketran and his transfiguration into the Ellimist (his homeworld gamer tag) as a final request to the dying Animorph. The Ketran race was virtually extinguished by the Capasins, who had seen transmissions of violent virtual Ketran games that had been broadcast into space and mistook them for a violent species that meddled with other ones. A Ketran named Toomin was one of the few survivors. These survivors became space nomads, seeking a replacement for their home planet. Toomin became the leader of this group and was the only survivor when it crash-landed on a mostly aquatic moon. His mind was absorbed and kept alive at the bottom of the sea by a moon-spanning entity known as Father that absorbed the information from the minds of every corpse that landed on its watery surface. After defeating Father at music, Toomin began to grow too intelligent for Father, defeating it on other levels of intellect and incorporating all the memories of corpses on the moon, eventually becoming a blending of minds.

After he defeated Father he began to wander the universe without purpose until he started to resolve conflicts and crises under the name Ellimist. The Ellimist influenced the universe like this for several thousand years until he encountered a being named Crayak, who existed to destroy all life in galaxies, a strong antithesis to what the Ellimist had come to stand for. Crayak engaged Ellimist in games that had entire planets at stake, not unlike the game "Alien Civilizations" from his homeworld. Ellimist did not fare well and lost far more often than he won. Losing motivation to continue fighting Crayak, the Ellimist temporarily retreated to the Andalite home planet, possibly beginning his worship as an Andalite god. The Andalites at the time were not the advanced civilization but a primitive collection of tribes. 

By living on the planet as an Andalite, the Ellimist learned that the key of survival was to create as many offspring as possible. Although so many die, with repeated efforts life could multiply faster than Crayak could wipe them out. With a renewed vigor, the Ellimist fought Crayak, creating the Pemalites, creators of the Chee, who spread quickly throughout the galaxy (until they were destroyed by Crayak's own creations, the Howlers). Although Crayak eventually caused his death, the Ellimist found he had become a part of space-time itself. Soon, both the Crayak and the Ellimist recognized direct combat to be much too dangerous for themselves and space-time itself. To prevent such catastrophic damage, Crayak and the Ellimist agree to construct the intricate "game" they are seen to play in the Animorphs series.

In the epilogue, it is hinted, though not confirmed, that the Animorph to whom the Ellimist told the entire story was none other than Rachel, who would be killed in battle in the final book of the series. She asks a final question about whether or not she mattered or made a difference in the war.  The Ellimist says that she did. The final sentence confirms Rachel's cessation of existence and ultimate death with: "A small strand of space-time went dark and coiled into nothingness."

2000 novels
Animorphs books
Novels about consciousness
Novels set on fictional planets
Prequel novels